Mastermind (Jason Wyngarde) is a supervillain appearing in American comic books published by Marvel Comics, commonly as an adversary of the X-Men. The original Mastermind was a mutant with the psionic ability to generate complex telepathic illusions at will that cause his victims to see whatever he wishes them to see. He was a founding member of the first Brotherhood of Evil Mutants and later a probationary member of the Lords Cardinal of the Hellfire Club, where he played an important role in "The Dark Phoenix Saga".

After Wyngarde's death from the Legacy Virus, his three daughters appeared: two possessing his illusion-creating abilities, Mastermind (Martinique Jason) and Lady Mastermind (Regan Wyngarde), and the X-Man Pixie.

Publication history
Created by writer Stan Lee and artist/co-writer Jack Kirby, he first appeared in The X-Men #4 (March 1964). He was given his "real name" of Jason Wyngarde by Chris Claremont and John Byrne.

The name and visual appearance of Jason Wyngarde as he appears in the Dark Phoenix Saga and later stories was originally based by artist John Byrne on that of British actor Peter Wyngarde, best known for playing Jason King, and who also played the leader of the Hellfire Club in an episode of The Avengers.

Fictional character biography
Nothing is known of Jason Wyngarde's life before joining the Brotherhood of Evil Mutants, except that he was a carnival mentalist. With Mastermind's help, the Brotherhood takes over Santo Marco, a fictional South American country, with an illusion of thousands of soldiers. However, the X-Men free the country, as Professor X sees through Mastermind's illusions, helping the X-Men when they believe they are trapped by a wall of flame. As a member of the Brotherhood of Evil Mutants, he participates in repeated clashes with the X-Men. He attempts to court his teammate Scarlet Witch, but his advances seem driven more by an unsatisfied need for love than by any true feelings for her, and she repeatedly spurns him. The Brotherhood attempts to lure the Stranger to their cause, but the Stranger temporarily turns Mastermind into solid matter.

After the spell wears off, Mastermind joins Factor Three, an organization that attempts to conquer the Earth. Factor Three eventually disbands when their leader turns out to be an alien, instead of a mutant. They team with the X-Men to defeat the alien Mutant Master. Mastermind is then captured by Sentinels, but freed by the X-Men. Former members of Factor Three, Blob and Unus, join with Mastermind to reform the Brotherhood of Evil Mutants.

Mastermind attempts to recruit Beast to his group, but fails and winds up battling him instead. Mastermind is briefly held captive by the second Secret Empire. Magneto returns to the Brotherhood to resume his leadership and creates Alpha the Ultimate Mutant. The Brotherhood of Evil Mutants battle the Defenders, but Alpha turns the entire Brotherhood team into infants.

After being restored to adulthood, Mastermind becomes involved with the Hellfire Club, who conspire to capture the X-Men for their own uses. He initially poses as Nikos, and begins a romance with Phoenix. Then, he manipulates her through the use of his own powers and a mind-tap mechanism created by Emma Frost, which he uses to project his illusion directly into her mind, causing her to believe she is living out the life of a Victorian aristocrat who was married to Jason Wyngarde (Mastermind), and was the Black Queen of the Hellfire Club. This turns her against the X-Men. Cyclops attempts to free Phoenix on the astral plane, but Mastermind confronts him there and soundly defeats him. Instead of binding Phoenix to him forever, as Mastermind had hoped, the shock of Scott's psychic "death" breaks her free from his control. Enraged at what he did to her, Phoenix reaches into his mind and makes him experience godhood for a moment. This experience leaves him catatonic.

When Mastermind recovers his sanity, he seeks revenge on everyone that caused him pain. He strikes down Emma Frost, leaving her comatose. He unbalances Rogue's shared psyche with Carol Danvers, prompting her to leave Mystique, while using an induced nightmare on Mystique to let her know he is responsible. Next, since Phoenix is dead, he decides to use those closest to her as proxies for his revenge. He disrupts Wolverine's wedding by psionically compelling his betrothed, Mariko Yashida, to reject him and open up dealings with the criminal underworld. He manipulates the X-Men into thinking Cyclops's fiancée, Madelyne Pryor, is the reincarnation of Dark Phoenix, hoping to goad them into killing her before he reveals the truth. However, Cyclops recognizes the patterns of Mastermind's power, and the X-Men defeat him in a short battle. Mastermind later seeks to tap into the power of the Phoenix Force, but is defeated by Rachel Summers and Excalibur. He is imprisoned with the delusion that he achieved cosmic awareness.

Mastermind later dies of the Legacy Virus. Before he succumbs, he asks Jean Grey's forgiveness for what he did to her in an attempt to gain control of the almighty Phoenix Force within her. She forgives him and he dies peacefully after using his final act to save Jean Grey from dying alongside him.

After his death, Mastermind appeared in a flashback sequence that revealed that he was paid by the supervillain known as "the General" to put one of his illusions into the mind of Sentry, making the Sentry "...so scared to use his powers, [That] he'll think the world will be attacked by the devil if he does." This would make Mastermind responsible for the creation of the Void itself, the evil counterpart of the Sentry who is actually the manifestation of the inhibitions that Mastermind implanted in the Sentry to prevent him from using his powers.

He would appear again in a flashback sequence when Lorna Dane discovered that she was the one responsible for the accident that killed her parents. Magneto, who had been drawn to the location of the accident by her magnetic pulse, had Mastermind use his illusionary powers to re-write Lorna's memories of that day, since he believed that she was not ready for her abilities or the life he could offer her, leaving her to believe that her parents died in a plane crash when she was an infant.

Joseph is resurrected under unknown circumstances and forms a new Brotherhood of Mutants with Astra and mutated deformed versions of Blob, Mastermind, Quicksilver, Scarlet Witch, and Toad, all actually clones created by Joseph.

During the "Empyre" storyline, Mastermind is among the mutants that were revived and residing on Krakoa. When Magik calls for the psychic mutants to come to Genosha and deal with a Cotati seed pod that is weak against psychic attacks, Mastermind is among the psychic mutants that answer the call. He is among those who witness Magik's fight with the Cotatinaught.

Characteristics

Powers and abilities 
Mastermind has the mutant ability to cast exceptionally realistic psionic illusions. He can psionically cause other people to see, hear, feel, smell, and taste things that do not actually exist. For example, he can make himself look and sound like a different person, or look and feel like a wall, or even seem invisible. He can use his powers to duplicate himself. The range of Mastermind's powers is wide enough to affect an entire city. He is even capable of affecting telepaths as powerful as Professor X and Jean Grey, although to manipulate Dark Phoenix he required an amplifying device called a "mind-tap mechanism" provided by the White Queen that enabled him to project illusions directly into the entity's mind, so that the entity "saw" them, and to monitor the entity's thoughts, both over great distances.

Family 
Mastermind's name and powers still live on through his daughters: Martinique Jason and Regan Wyngarde. Both appear to be stronger than the original Mastermind; Martinique can create citywide illusions that even hypnotize people to believe they are in a whole new era and Regan's lethal illusions can continue even after she has been rendered unconscious.

The X-Man Pixie's mother teleports herself to the Wyngarde Mansion, where Regan and Martinique are fighting one another. Pixie's mother states Pixie is their sister, revealing Jason is her father.

Reception

Accolades 

 In 2009, IGN ranked Mastermind 98th in their Top 100 Comic Book Villains" list.
 In 2017, WhatCulture ranked Mastermind 7th in their "10 Most Evil X-Men Villains" list.
 In 2018, CBR.com ranked Mastermind 16th in their "25 X-Men Villains, Ranked From Weakest To Strongest" list.
 In 2019, CBR.com ranked Mastermind 2nd in their "10 X-Men Villains that Seem Totally Lame (But Are Actually Super Powerful)" list.
 In 2020, CBR.com ranked Mastermind 2nd in their "10 Best Illusionists In Marvel" list.
 In 2021, Screen Rant included Mastermind in their "X-Men: The 10 Most Powerful Members Of The Brotherhood Of Evil Mutants" list.

Other versions
In the alternate timeline seen in the 1995–1996 Age of Apocalypse storyline, Jason Wyngarde is one of the many victims of Apocalypse's regime. He is a victim of the experiments of a time-traveling Sugar Man, which left him mute, though he is rescued by a time-traveling X-Man, as well as Forge and Magneto. Years later, he joines Forge's Outcasts, a resistance cell traveling under the cover of a theater troupe. He was ultimately killed by the bounty hunter Domino.

In the alternate timeline seen in the 2005 storyline House of M, Mastermind is mentioned to be a business rival of Tony Stark.

In the alternate universe seen in the 2009 miniseries X-Men: Noir, Wyngarde appears as a member of Eric Magnus's Brotherhood of Mutant detectives in NY.

In the Ultimate Universe, Mastermind a member of Magneto's Brotherhood, here called the Brotherhood of Mutant Supremacy. In contrast to his appearance in the mainstream Marvel universe, here is a lanky, white-haired, man with sunglasses and a ponytail. He replaces Mystique's role posing as Magneto in the S.H.I.E.L.D. prison, though with the company of his girlfriend Stacy. In the 2008 miniseries Ultimates 3, he partners with Pyro when Magneto and other Brotherhood members clash with the Ultimates at Magneto's base in the Savage Land. He attacks Valkyrie with an illusion of her greatest fear, but Valkyrie kills him with her sword.

In other media

Television
 Mastermind makes a non-speaking appearance in the Spider-Man and His Amazing Friends episode "The Prison Plot". This version is a member of Magneto's Brotherhood of Evil Mutants, and also known as the "Maestro of Illusion".
 Mastermind appears in the X-Men: The Animated Series four-part episode "The Dark Phoenix", voiced by Nigel Bennett. This version is a member of the Inner Circle Club. Additionally, an alternate timeline version of Wyngarde from a world without the X-Men appears in the episode "One Man's Worth (Part 1)".
 Mastermind appears in X-Men: Evolution, voiced by Campbell Lane. This version is a member of Magneto's Acolytes.
 Mastermind appears in Marvel Anime: X-Men, voiced by Haruhiko Jō in the Japanese version and by Travis Willingham in the English version. This version is the leader of the Inner Circle, who initially seek to manipulate Jean Grey into becoming the Phoenix before she sacrifices herself to prevent them from using its power. In response, Mastermind frames Emma Frost for Grey's death and takes on the alias of Japanese researcher "Jun Sanada" to form a secret alliance with the U-Men and pretend to work under Japanese scientist Dr. Yui Sasaki to manipulate her son Takeo, a mutant capable of warping reality, into using his power to allow mutants to take over the world. After the X-Men discover his schemes, Mastermind attempts to use Takeo to weaken them, only to be killed by the boy after he loses control of his powers.

Video games
Mastermind appears as a playable character in Lego Marvel Super Heroes, voiced again by Travis Willingham. This version is a member of the Brotherhood of Mutants.  He is a non-playable boss in the handheld version of the game.

Miscellaneous
Jason Wyngarde appears in Wolverine: The Lost Trail, voiced by Bill Irwin.

References

External links
 Mastermind (Jason Wyngarde) at Marvel.com

Characters created by Jack Kirby
Characters created by Stan Lee
Comics characters introduced in 1964
Fictional hypnotists and indoctrinators
Fictional illusionists
Marvel Comics characters who have mental powers
Marvel Comics male supervillains
Marvel Comics mutants
Marvel Comics telepaths
Villains in animated television series